{{DISPLAYTITLE:C10H14N2O6}}
The molecular formula C10H14N2O6 (molar mass: 258.23 g/mol) may refer to:

 3-Methyluridine, also called N3-methyluridine
 5-Methyluridine, also called ribothymidine